The 2015 Polish Basketball Cup was the 51st edition of Poland's national cup competition for men basketball teams. was is managed by the Polish Basketball League (PLK) and was held in Gdynia, in the Gdynia Sports Arena, in February 2015.

Qualification
Teams who played in European competitions qualified directly, along with hosts Asseco Gdynia. The other five teams were determined by league standings in the 2014–15 PLK season after the first half of the regular season.

Bracket
The draw took place on 19 January 2015.

Final
Zielona Góra won the game 71–77 and captured its first Polish Cup title. Zielona Góra's Przemysław Zamojski was named the Final MVP.

References

Cup
Polish Basketball Cup